A strap is a ribbon used to fasten.

Strap or STRAP may also refer to:

Shoulder strap, strap of a clothing over shoulder.
Currency strap, straps used to bundle banknotes
Aerial straps, a type of aerial apparatus on which various feats of strength and flexibility may be performed
Lower third, the graphics at the bottom of telecasts, in the UK known as a strap or namestrap
 Strap, a colloquial word for a handgun
  The Strap, punishment. Usually a long band or strip of leather.
The Straps, the band
STRAP, human enzyme
 STRETCH Assembly Program (STRAP), an assembler for IBM 7030 Stretch
STRAP Clearance, a form of security vetting in the United Kingdom
 Strap (options), an option trading strategy in finance
Strapping option, a hardware configuration setting usually sensed during power-up/bootstrapping

See also
 
 Strapping, a flexible flat material used to fasten objects